Ross Moyle (15 October 1913 – 24 October 1942) was an Australian cricketer. He played in fifteen first-class matches for South Australia between 1933 and 1940.

Moyle enlisted in the Australian armed forces and served as a sergeant in the 2/8 Field Ambulance Australian Army Medical Corps in the North Africa campaign. During the Second Battle of El Alamein Moyle was wounded in his abdomen and right thigh and died of his wounds in Cairo. He was Mentioned in Dispatches for his gallantry.

See also
 List of South Australian representative cricketers

References

Sources
 Growden, G. (2019) Cricketers at War, ABC Books: Sydney. .

External links
 

1913 births
1942 deaths
Australian cricketers
South Australia cricketers
Cricketers from Adelaide
Australian military personnel killed in World War II
Australian Army personnel of World War II
Australian Army soldiers